Avishek is a masculine given name which may refer to:

 Avishek Das (born 2001), Bangladeshi cricketer
 Avishek Karthik, Indian actor in Tamil language films
 Avishek Mitra (born 1992), Bangladeshi cricketer
 Avishek Sinha (born 1984), Indian cricketer

Masculine given names